Eucyrta albicollis is a moth of the subfamily Arctiinae first described by Felder in 1874. It is found in Brazil, Peru and French Guiana.

References

Phaegopterina